The Munich Steam Locomotive Company (Dampflok-Gesellschaft München or DGM) is charitable society based in Munich, Germany, whose aim is to preserve the oil-fired steam locomotive, number 41 018, as an operational locomotive.

Society 

The society was founded in 1976 and was originally called the Interessengemeinschaft 41 018. e.V. ('41 018 Interest Group') as the DRG Class 41 steam locomotive, no. 41 018, was purchased. This steam engine is registered as a technological monument in the state of Bavaria, Germany.

The society has 11 members who are joint owners of the locomotives and who have succeeded in keeping and operating locomotive 41 018 for more than 30 years. The steam engine is homed at the Augsburg Railway Park where the necessary work is also carried out.

Locomotives 

The following locomotives are owned by the DGM and stored at the Augsburg Railway Park:
Steam locomotive, no. 41 018, since 1976 − operational − oil-fired
Steam locomotive, no. 41 364, since 1983 − rolling
Steam locomotive, no. 44 606, since 2003 − rolling
Köf II, no. 63 11, used for shunting duties

Purchase of 41 018 

No. 042 018-2 was bought, because she was the best of the 29 surviving Class 41s, having only had an L2/H2.8 overhaul in 1975. She had completed just die 66,000 kilometer since her overhaul and could therefore continue to be worked for a long time, both in terms of distance and time.

Events 

Special steam trains are hauled by 41 018 in cooperation with other organisations.

External links 
Munich Steam Locomotive Company website (German)
Augsburg Railway Park (German)
Ulmer Eisenbahnfreunde - a sister German railway society (German)

Tourist attractions in Munich
Buildings and structures in Munich
Railway museums in Germany
Heritage railways in Germany
Railway museums in Bavaria
Companies based in Munich
History of rail transport in Bavaria
1976 establishments in West Germany
Railway companies established in 1976
German companies established in 1976